Vladimír Országh (born May 24, 1977) is a Slovak former professional ice hockey player. Now he is head coach of HC Slovan Bratislava and assistant coach of Craig Ramsay at the Slovak representation.

Playing career
As a youth, Országh played in the 1991 Quebec International Pee-Wee Hockey Tournament with a team from Poprad.

Országh was drafted into the National Hockey League (NHL) in 1995 by the New York Islanders in the fifth round (106th overall) and he has been playing in the NHL since 1997. From 1997 through to 2000, Vladimír Országh was attempting to crack the New York Islanders line-up, as he had a stint of 34 games in the NHL over those three years, tallying a total of five points (3 goals and 2 assists). After becoming an unrestricted free agent after the 1999–2000 NHL season, Országh signed a contract with the Djurgårdens IF hockey team of the Swedish Elitserien, based in Stockholm. In Sweden, he had a breakthrough season, scoring 23 goals and marking 13 assists, for a combined total of 36 points. The scouts of the Nashville Predators of the NHL noticed Országh's solid performance and signed him as a free agent the following season. In his time with the Predators, he has tallied 105 points (47 goals and 58 assists) and he has also helped them earn their first play-off spot in the team's six-year history. Throughout his six years of NHL experience, Országh wore the number 33 jersey and has played both the left wing and the right wing positions. On December 30, 2005, Országh joined the St. Louis Blues after he was claimed off of waivers. Orszagh missed the entire 2006–2007 season due to a knee injury.

Career statistics

Regular season and playoffs

International

References

External links

1977 births
Djurgårdens IF Hockey players
Living people
Lowell Lock Monsters players
Luleå HF players
Nashville Predators players
New York Islanders draft picks
New York Islanders players
Sportspeople from Banská Bystrica
St. Louis Blues players
Slovak ice hockey right wingers
Utah Grizzlies (IHL) players
Slovak expatriate ice hockey players in the United States
Slovak expatriate ice hockey players in Sweden
Slovak ice hockey coaches